WHTF is a Top 40 (CHR) radio station in the Tallahassee, Florida market owned by Adams Radio Group.  Its studios are located in northeast Tallahassee, and its transmitter is based in Bradfordville, Florida.

External links

HTF
Contemporary hit radio stations in the United States
Radio stations established in 1980
1980 establishments in Florida